Clement Victor Gunaratne (Sinhala:ක්ලෙමෙන්ට් වික්ටර් ගුණරත්න) (known as C. V. Gunaratne) was Sri Lanka's Cabinet Minister of Industries Development. He and his wife along with 20 others  were killed by a suicide bomber of the LTTE organization on 7 June 2000.

He was educated at the Royal College, Colombo where was captain of the rugby team. His father was Major L. V. Gooneratne, ED, CCC the first Mayor of Dehiwala - Mt Lavinia He entered politics as a member of the Dehiwala-Mount Lavinia Municipal Council in which he was Leader of the Opposition (Sri Lanka Freedom Party). He was chosen as a Central Committee Member of the SLFP in early 1970s and was elected to parliament in the parliamentary general election held in 1989.

See also
Notable assassinations of the Sri Lankan Civil War
List of attacks attributed to the LTTE
Sri Lankan Civil War

References

External links
Nation bids farewell to the late minister and his wife
Sri Lankan Minister Killed in Suicide Bomb Attack

Government ministers of Sri Lanka
Assassinated Sri Lankan politicians
2000 deaths
Alumni of Royal College, Colombo
Sri Lankan terrorism victims
Terrorism deaths in Sri Lanka
Terrorist incidents in Sri Lanka in 2000
Suicide bombings in Sri Lanka
Members of the 9th Parliament of Sri Lanka
Members of the 10th Parliament of Sri Lanka
Sinhalese politicians
Year of birth missing
People killed during the Sri Lankan Civil War
Industries ministers of Sri Lanka
Sri Lankan Roman Catholics
2000 crimes in Sri Lanka